Christian Brothers College, Burwood (CBC Burwood) was a Catholic high school located in Burwood, Sydney Australia.

The school was founded in 1909. It was announced on 25 March 2008 that the school would close at the end of 2009, due to a decline in enrolment arising from a change in demographics in the suburbs surrounding the school. At closing, it taught boys from Year 7 to Year 10.

The school chapel, the school grotto, the lower yard classrooms, and the old wall ball court were demolished, though the brothers' house and other buildings were left intact.

House colours
Christian Brothers' College Burwood's homeroom classes and sport teams were divided by colours, which were nominated by significant names:

 Red for Gadigal (the Gadigal people once lived on the land the school was built on)
 Yellow for Moylan (Br. Brian Moylan)
 Green for O'Neill (the first principal)
 Blue for Delany (one of the school's principals)

Notable alumni

 Scott Sio - Rugby player
 John Brown - former MP of Parramatta
 Robert Luketic - film director (Legally Blonde and 21)
 Anthony Šerić - soccer player
 Taliauli Latukefu - actor
 Emilio De Fanti - Australian Weightlifter

References

1909 establishments in Australia
2009 disestablishments in Australia
Boys' schools in New South Wales
Educational institutions established in 1909
Defunct Catholic schools in Australia
Educational institutions disestablished in 2009
Burwood, New South Wales
Former Congregation of Christian Brothers schools in Australia